The Avenger is a 1962 film directed by Giorgio Venturini.

Plot summary 
Aeneas leads escaped survivors of the Trojan War to new land in Italy. Based on Virgil's The Aeneid.

Cast 
 Steve Reeves as Enea (Aeneas)
 Carla Marlier as Lavinia, Latino's Daughter
 Liana Orfei as Camilla, Queen of the Volsci
 Giacomo Rossi-Stuart as Eurialo (Euryalus)
 Gianni Garko as Turno (Turnus), King of the Rusalie (Rutuli)
 Mario Ferrari as King Latino (Latinus)
 Lulla Selli as Queen Amata, Latino's Wife
 Maurice Poli as Mesenzio (Mezentius), Turno's Henchman
 Luciano Benetti as Sergesto (Sergestus)
 Pietro Capanna as Bisia
 Enzo Fiermonte as Acate (Achates)
 Charles Band as Ascanio (Ascanius)
 Benito Stefanelli as Niso (Nisus)
 Nerio Bernardi as Drance
 Adriano Vitale as Dancer
 Walter Zappolini as Dancer
 Robert Bettoni as Pallante (Pallas)

Release
The Avenger was released in Italy on 28 November 1962 with a running time of 95 minutes. It was released in the United States in June 1965 with a 105-minute running time.

See also
 List of historical drama films
 List of French films of 1962
 List of Italian films of 1962

References

Footnotes

Sources

External links 
 
 

1962 films
Films based on poems
1960s fantasy adventure films
Films based on classical mythology
Works based on the Aeneid
Peplum films
Films scored by Giovanni Fusco
Sword and sandal films
Italian fantasy adventure films
French fantasy adventure films
Yugoslav fantasy adventure films
Films directed by Giorgio Venturini
1960s Italian films
1960s French films